The European Innovation Council (EIC) was introduced by the European Commission to support the commercialization of high-risk, high-impact technologies in the European Union. The fully-fledged EIC was launched March 2021 under Horizon Europe and is incorporated within the European Innovation Council and SMEs Executive Agency (EISMEA).  Its goal is to aid researchers, start-ups and SMEs bring their innovations to market by providing funding, networking and partnership opportunities, and business acceleration services. In its latest form, the concept has been put forth by the EU Research Commissioner Carlos Moedas in mid-2015.  The EIC has a budget of €10.1 billion to support innovations throughout the lifecycle from early stage research, to proof of concept, technology transfer, and the financing and scale up of start-ups and SMEs.

Pilot Phase (2018–2021) 
The EIC pilot phase was launched in 2018, incorporating existing instruments under the Horizon 2020 programme, in particular the SME instrument and Future & Emerging Technology (FET) programme. These funding schemes were brought together in single work programme to provide direct support to innovators throughout Europe.

The EIC pilot phase, together with the existing instruments, supported:
 Over 430 projects on Future and Emerging Technologies, involving over 2,700 partners. These projects have generated over 3000 peer reviewed scientific articles, over 600 innovations, and over 100 patents.
 Over 5,700 startups and SMEs, who have raised over €5 billion in follow up investments (3 euro for every euro from the EU budget) and on average, more than doubled the number of employees in a 2-year period.

Funding Opportunities

EIC Pathfinder 
The EIC Pathfinder programme supports the research of ideas for radically new technologies. Applicants participating in EIC Pathfinder projects are typically scientists, entrepreneurial researchers and, research organisations, start-ups, high-tech SMEs and industrial stakeholders interested in technological research and innovation. Grants of up to €3–4 million support early stage development of future technologies up to proof of concept.

EIC Transition 
Building on technologies generated by Pathfinder, the EIC Transition funds innovation activities that go beyond the experimental proof of principle in laboratory to supports both:

 the maturation and validation of novel technology in the lab and in relevant application environments
 the development of a business case and (business) model towards the innovation's future commercialisation.

Grants of up to €2.5 million and more are available to validate and demonstrate technology in application-relevant environment and develop market readiness.

EIC Accelerator 
The EIC Accelerator supports individual Small and Medium Enterprises (SMEs), in particular start-ups and spinout companies to develop and scale up game-changing innovations, from TRL5 to market deployment and scale-up. In some cases small mid-caps (up to 500 employees) are supported.

The EIC Accelerator provides substantial financial support, with a combination of:

 grant funding (non-dilutive) of up to €2.5 million for innovation development costs (TRL5 to 8);
 an investments (usually direct equity investments) of up to €15 million managed by the EIC Fund for market deployment and scale up (TRL9 onwards)

The EIC Accelerator covers all areas of technology, with the goal to support the development and effective deployment of any European innovation benefiting Europeans, economically or socially. It is the first instrument developed on the idea that Europe needs to ascertain its "sovereignty" or "strategic autonomy" over technologies.

In addition, EIC selected companies receive coaching, mentoring, access to investors and corporates, and many other opportunities as part of the EIC community.

The EIC Fund 
The EIC Fund is new feature of the EIC, introduced in 2020 under the Pilot phase. The EIC Fund provides in the form of equity from €0.5 million to €15 million the investment component awarded under the EIC Accelerator to selected breakthrough innovation companies. The EIC Fund is a unique entity owned by the European Union represented by the European Commission and established to make direct equity investments in companies.

The EIC Fund:

 Provides patient capital in the form of equity or quasi-equity (which may also be blended with a grant component) to SMEs and start-ups selected through the highly competitive and rigorous EIC Accelerator. 
 Bridges the funding gap for start-ups with seed capital to series B financing, where market entry is at most in a pilot phase to prepare the scaling up of breakthrough European innovations.
 Aims to crowd in other investors, further sharing risks by building a large network of capital providers and strategic partners suitable for co-investments and follow on funding

EIC Ambassadors 
A number of influential innovators are chosen as EIC Ambassadors to speak about the EIC and its impacts and developments in local, national, and European media, and to support the improvement of the EIC with their insights and feedback. There are currently 33 EIC Ambassadors for 2021–2027:

 Kerstin Bock, co-founder & CEO of Openers
 Irina Borodina, co-founder and CTO of BioPhero
 Jo Bury, managing director of Flanders Institute of Biotechnology
 Paddy Cosgrave, founder and CEO of Web Summit
 Cristian Dascalu, founder or co-founder of several businesses and projects
 Dermot Diamond, Professor of Sensor Science and Materials Chemistry
 Gráinne Dwyer, co-founder of Stori Creative
 Angele Giuliano, CEO of AcrossLimits
 Jim Hagemann Snabe, Chair Siemens AG, Chair AP Moller Maersk A/S
 Marjolein Helder, CEO of Plant-e
 Taavet Hinrikus, Chairman of Wise
 Ingmar Hoerr, founder and chairman of the supervisory board of CureVac
 Fredrik Hörstedt, Director at Vinnova
 Talis Juhna, Professor and vice-rector for research at Riga Technical University
 Bindi Karia, European Innovation Expert & Advisor
 Stavriana A. Kofteros, Vice Chair of the Research & Innovation Foundation
 Jana Kolarm, executive director of CERIC-ERIC
 Krisztina Kovacs-Schreiner, CEO of Lixea
 Jerzy Langer, Physicist
 Alexandru Müller, Head of the Microwave Laboratory with IMT-Bucharest
 Valeria Nicolosi, Professor of Nanomaterials & Advanced Microscopy
 Carlos Oliveira, Executive President of José Neves Foundation
 Veronika Oudova, CEO & Co-founder of S-Biomedic
 César Pascual García, Lead Research Associate at Luxembourg Institute of Science and Technology
 Raycho Raychev, founder & CEO of EnduroSat
 Or Retzkin, CEO and co-founder of EyeControl
 Marie-Elisabeth Rusling, Director at AURA srl
 Emmanuel Stratakis, founder and CEO of Biomimetic PC
 Constantijn van Oranje, Leader of Techleap.nl
 Roxanne Varza, Director of Station F
 Roberto Verganti, Professor of Leadership and Innovation
 Cristina Vicini-Rademacher, founder and CEO of Vicini Strategy
 Yousef Yousef, CEO of LG Sonic

See also

 European Innovation Council and SMEs Executive Agency
 European Research Council (ERC)
 Framework Programmes for Research and Technological Development
 European Institute of Technology (EIT)
 European Research Area (ERA)
 Directorate-General for Research
 Directorate-General of the Joint Research Centre (European Commission)
 European Research Advisory Board (EURAB)
 European Council of Applied Sciences and Engineering (Euro-CASE)
 Information Society Technologies Advisory Group (ISTAG)
 Lisbon Strategy

References

External links
European Innovation Council Official Website

21st century in technology
European Union and science and technology
Science and technology in Europe
Technology strategy